This is the discography of Kool Moe Dee, an American recording artist from New York, NY.

A former the Treacherous Three member, Kool Moe Dee has released five solo studio albums, three compilation albums, thirty-four singles (including seventeen as featured artist).

Albums

Studio albums

Compilation albums

Extended plays

Singles

As lead artist

As featured artist

Guest appearances

References

Notes

Citations

Hip hop discographies
Discographies of American artists